Sellappanpettai is a village in the Thanjavur taluk of Thanjavur district, Tamil Nadu, India.

Demographics 

As per the 2001 census, Sellappanpettai had a total population of 1540 with 762 males and 778 females. The sex ratio was 1021. The literacy rate was 61.54.

References 

 

Villages in Thanjavur district